Forton is a village and civil parish in the Wyre district of the English county of Lancashire near the Forest of Bowland. It is near the A6 road, between the city of Lancaster and the town of Garstang. Its population as measured at the 2011 Census is 1,213. It has one school, Forton Primary School, several churches and one pub, the New Holly.

Lancaster (Forton) services 

Lancaster (Forton) services is a motorway service station near Forton, between junctions 32 and 33 of the M6 motorway in England. The nearest city is Lancaster, about seven miles (11 km) to the north. The station is operated by Moto.

Notable people 
Tom Boardman, British auto racing driver

Transport 
For transport there is the A6 road and the M6 motorway which has Lancaster (Forton) services on it.

Nearby settlements 
Nearby settlements include the city of Lancaster, the town of Garstang, the village of Hollins Lane and the hamlets of Potters Brook and Shireshead.

Nearby waters 
Nearby waters include the Lancaster Canal, the River Wyre and Clevelymere.

Location grid

See also

Listed buildings in Forton, Lancashire

References

 http://www.genuki.org.uk/big/eng/LAN/Forton/
 https://web.archive.org/web/20100328105418/http://www.shireshead-forton.co.uk/village.htm#The%20famous%20mushroom

External links

https://www.visionofbritain.org.uk/place/10235

Geography of the Borough of Wyre
Villages in Lancashire
Civil parishes in Lancashire